Toobeah, pronounced 'two beer', is a rural town and locality in the Goondiwindi Region, Queensland, Australia. The locality is on the border of Queensland and New South Wales.

Geography 
Toobeah is in the Darling Downs region.

History 
The town takes its name from the Toobeah railway station on the South Western railway line, which was established in 1910. The name is believed to be an Aboriginal word indicating to point, possibly because of the presence of a sign post at the road junction where the railway station was built.

Toobeah Provisional School opened on 12 October 1914. On 1 December 1914 it became Toobeah State School. It closed on 30 April 1964.

Amenities 
Facilities in the town include the Coronation Hotel and a general store.

References

External links

Toobeah - Goondiwindi Regional Council

Towns in Queensland
Towns in the Darling Downs
Goondiwindi Region
Localities in Queensland